The Charles Lathrop Parsons Award is usually a biennial award that recognizes outstanding public service by a member of the American Chemical Society (ACS).  Recipients are chosen by the American Chemical Society Board of Directors, from a list of no more than five recipients presented by the ACS Committee on Grants and Awards.  They have the discretion to offer the award in successive years if they so wish.  It was established in 1952, and is named in honor of its first recipient, Charles Lathrop Parsons. The first woman to receive the award was Mary L. Good in 1991.

Award recipients
 2021 Ruth Woodall
 2019 Attila E. Pavlath
 2017 John I. Brauman
 2015 Paul H. L. Walter
 2013 Geraldine L. Richmond
 2011 Michael E. Strem
 2009 Glenn A. Crosby and Jane L. Crosby
 2007 S. Allen Heininger
 2005 Marye Anne Fox
 2003 Zafra M. Lerman
 2001 Richard N. Zare
 1999 Mike McCormack
 1995 Alfred Bader
 1993 B. R. Stanerson
 1991 Mary L. Good
 1989 Arnold O. Beckman
 1987 Norman Hackerman
 1985 Franklin A. Long
 1983 James G. Martin
 1978 Charles G. Overberger
 1976 William Oliver Baker
 1974 Russell W. Peterson
 1973 Charles C. Price
 1970 W. Albert Noyes, Jr.
 1967 Donald F. Hornig
 1964 Glenn T. Seaborg
 1961 George B. Kistiakowsky
 1958 Roger Adams
 1955 James B. Conant
 1952 Charles Lathrop Parsons

See also

 List of chemistry awards

References

Awards established in 1952
Awards of the American Chemical Society
1952 establishments in the United States